The 2007 Southend-on-Sea Council election took place on 3 May 2007 to elect members of Southend-on-Sea Unitary Council in Essex, England. One third of the council was up for election and the Conservative party stayed in overall control of the council.

After the election, the composition of the council was
Conservative 30
Liberal Democrat 10
Labour 7
Independent 4

Election result
The results saw the Conservatives retain control of the council with a majority of 9 seats over the other parties. The former leader of the council, Anna Waite, who had been defeated in the 2006 election, was returned to the council in St Luke's ward after defeating the Labour councillor Kevin Robinson. However the Conservatives lost a usually safe seat in Thorpe to independent Ron Woodley by 791 votes.

For the second election in a row a Conservative leader of the council was defeated. Murray Foster was defeated in Prittlewell ward by Liberal Democrat Ric Morgan, forcing the Conservatives to choose a new leader. Nigel Holdcroft was unopposed within the Conservative group and became the new leader of the council.

Overall turnout in the election was 31%.

Ward results

References

2007
2007 English local elections
2000s in Essex